Asociación Cultural y Deportiva Altos Hornos Zapla is an Argentine Football club from Palpalá, in the Jujuy Province of Argentina. The team currently plays in the regionalised 4th level of Argentinian football, the Torneo Argentino B.

Primera Division Argentina
The club has played at the highest level of Argentine football on six occasions, when it qualified to play in the National tournaments of 1974, 1978, 1979, 1983, 1984 and 1985, but Altos Hornos never made it past the first group stage. Some of the highlights of its time in the top flight include 3 wins over Gimnasia y Esgrima (LP) in 1974 and 1978, a win over Newell's Old Boys and Colón de Santa Fe (both in 1974), another victory over Argentinos Juniors in 1979 and a 1–0 victory over Boca Juniors in 1985, being coached by Juan Carlos Murúa.

Titles
La Liga Jujeña: 15

See also
List of football clubs in Argentina
Argentine football league system

External links
Fan site 
Zapla Corazón 

 
Football clubs in Jujuy Province
Association football clubs established in 1947
1947 establishments in Argentina